This article lists Wikipedia articles about named mathematical inequalities.

Inequalities in pure mathematics

Analysis
 Agmon's inequality
 Askey–Gasper inequality
 Babenko–Beckner inequality
 Bernoulli's inequality
 Bernstein's inequality (mathematical analysis)
 Bessel's inequality
 Bihari–LaSalle inequality
 Bohnenblust–Hille inequality
 Borell–Brascamp–Lieb inequality
 Brezis–Gallouet inequality
 Carleman's inequality
 Chebyshev–Markov–Stieltjes inequalities
 Chebyshev's sum inequality
 Clarkson's inequalities
 Eilenberg's inequality
 Fekete–Szegő inequality
 Fenchel's inequality
 Friedrichs's inequality
 Gagliardo–Nirenberg interpolation inequality
 Gårding's inequality
 Grothendieck inequality
 Grunsky's inequalities
 Hanner's inequalities
 Hardy's inequality
 Hardy–Littlewood inequality
 Hardy–Littlewood–Sobolev inequality
 Harnack's inequality
 Hausdorff–Young inequality
 Hermite–Hadamard inequality
 Hilbert's inequality
 Hölder's inequality
 Jackson's inequality
 Jensen's inequality
 Khabibullin's conjecture on integral inequalities
 Kantorovich inequality
 Karamata's inequality
 Korn's inequality
 Ladyzhenskaya's inequality
 Landau–Kolmogorov inequality
 Lebedev–Milin inequality
 Lieb–Thirring inequality
 Littlewood's 4/3 inequality
 Markov brothers' inequality
 Mashreghi–Ransford inequality
 Max–min inequality
 Minkowski's inequality
 Poincaré inequality
 Popoviciu's inequality
 Prékopa–Leindler inequality
 Rayleigh–Faber–Krahn inequality
 Remez inequality
 Riesz rearrangement inequality
 Schur test
 Shapiro inequality
 Sobolev inequality
 Steffensen's inequality
 Szegő inequality
 Three spheres inequality
 Trace inequalities
 Trudinger's theorem
 Turán's inequalities
 Von Neumann's inequality
 Wirtinger's inequality for functions
 Young's convolution inequality
 Young's inequality for products

Inequalities relating to means
 Hardy–Littlewood maximal inequality
 Inequality of arithmetic and geometric means
 Ky Fan inequality
 Levinson's inequality
 Maclaurin's inequality
 Mahler's inequality
 Muirhead's inequality
 Newton's inequalities
 Stein–Strömberg theorem

Combinatorics
 Binomial coefficient bounds
 Factorial bounds
 XYZ inequality
 Fisher's inequality
 Ingleton's inequality
 Lubell–Yamamoto–Meshalkin inequality
 Nesbitt's inequality
 Rearrangement inequality
 Schur's inequality
 Shapiro inequality
 Stirling's formula (bounds)

Differential equations
 Grönwall's inequality

Geometry

 Alexandrov–Fenchel inequality
 Aristarchus's inequality
 Barrow's inequality
 Berger–Kazdan comparison theorem
 Blaschke–Lebesgue inequality
 Blaschke–Santaló inequality
 Bishop–Gromov inequality
 Bogomolov–Miyaoka–Yau inequality
 Bonnesen's inequality
 Brascamp–Lieb inequality
 Brunn–Minkowski inequality
 Castelnuovo–Severi inequality
 Cheng's eigenvalue comparison theorem
 Clifford's theorem on special divisors
 Cohn-Vossen's inequality
 Erdős–Mordell inequality
 Euler's theorem in geometry
 Gromov's inequality for complex projective space
 Gromov's systolic inequality for essential manifolds
 Hadamard's inequality
 Hadwiger–Finsler inequality
 Hinge theorem
 Hitchin–Thorpe inequality
 Isoperimetric inequality
 Jordan's inequality
 Jung's theorem
 Loewner's torus inequality
 Łojasiewicz inequality
 Loomis–Whitney inequality
 Melchior's inequality
 Milman's reverse Brunn–Minkowski inequality
 Milnor–Wood inequality
 Minkowski's first inequality for convex bodies
 Myers's theorem
 Noether inequality
 Ono's inequality
 Pedoe's inequality
 Ptolemy's inequality
 Pu's inequality
 Riemannian Penrose inequality
 Toponogov's theorem
 Triangle inequality
 Weitzenböck's inequality
 Wirtinger inequality (2-forms)

Information theory
 Inequalities in information theory
 Kraft's inequality
 Log sum inequality
 Welch bounds

Algebra

 Abhyankar's inequality
 Pisier–Ringrose inequality

Linear algebra 

 Abel's inequality
 Bregman–Minc inequality
 Cauchy–Schwarz inequality
 Golden–Thompson inequality
 Hadamard's inequality
 Hoffman-Wielandt inequality
Peetre's inequality
 Sylvester's rank inequality
 Triangle inequality
Trace inequalities

Eigenvalue inequalities 

 Bendixson's inequality
 Weyl's inequality in matrix theory
 Cauchy interlacing theorem
 Poincaré separation theorem

Number theory
 Bonse's inequality
 Large sieve inequality
 Pólya–Vinogradov inequality
 Turán–Kubilius inequality
 Weyl's inequality

Probability theory and statistics 
 Azuma's inequality
 Bennett's inequality, an upper bound on the probability that the sum of independent random variables deviates from its expected value by more than any specified amount
 Bhatia–Davis inequality, an upper bound on the variance of any bounded probability distribution
 Bernstein inequalities (probability theory)
 Boole's inequality
 Borell–TIS inequality
 BRS-inequality
 Burkholder's inequality
 Burkholder–Davis–Gundy inequalities
 Cantelli's inequality
 Chebyshev's inequality
 Chernoff's inequality
 Chung–Erdős inequality
 Concentration inequality
 Cramér–Rao inequality
 Doob's martingale inequality
 Dvoretzky–Kiefer–Wolfowitz inequality
 Eaton's inequality, a bound on the largest absolute value of a linear combination of bounded random variables
 Emery's inequality
 Entropy power inequality
 Etemadi's inequality
 Fannes–Audenaert inequality
 Fano's inequality
 Fefferman's inequality
 Fréchet inequalities
 Gauss's inequality
 Gauss–Markov theorem, the statement that the least-squares estimators in certain linear models are the best linear unbiased estimators
 Gaussian correlation inequality
 Gaussian isoperimetric inequality
 Gibbs's inequality
 Hoeffding's inequality
 Hoeffding's lemma
 Jensen's inequality
 Khintchine inequality
 Kolmogorov's inequality
 Kunita–Watanabe inequality
 Le Cam's theorem
 Lenglart's inequality
 Marcinkiewicz–Zygmund inequality
 Markov's inequality
 McDiarmid's inequality
 Paley–Zygmund inequality
 Pinsker's inequality
 Popoviciu's inequality on variances
 Prophet inequality
 Rao–Blackwell theorem
 Ross's conjecture, a lower bound on the average waiting time in certain queues
 Samuelson's inequality
 Shearer's inequality
 Stochastic Gronwall inequality
 Talagrand's concentration inequality
 Vitale's random Brunn–Minkowski inequality
 Vysochanskiï–Petunin inequality

Topology
 Berger's inequality for Einstein manifolds

Inequalities particular to physics 
 Ahlswede–Daykin inequality
 Bell's inequality – see Bell's theorem
 Bell's original inequality
 CHSH inequality
 Clausius–Duhem inequality
 Correlation inequality – any of several inequalities
 FKG inequality
 Ginibre inequality
 Griffiths inequality
 Heisenberg's inequality
 Holley inequality
 Leggett–Garg inequality
 Riemannian Penrose inequality
 Rushbrooke inequality
 Tsirelson's inequality

See also 

 Comparison theorem
 List of mathematical identities
 Lists of mathematics topics
 List of set identities and relations

Inequalities